Nerius is a genus of cactus flies in the family Neriidae.

Species
Nerius brachantichirinus Hennig, 1937
Nerius brunneus Macquart, 1835
Nerius czernyi Aczél, 1961
Nerius femoratus Coquillett, 1898
Nerius lanei Aczél, 1961
Nerius laticornis Hennig, 1937
Nerius ochraceus Schiner, 1868
Nerius pilifer Fabricius, 1805
Nerius plurivittatus Bigot, 1886
Nerius rubescens Macquart, 1843
Nerius striatus Doleschall, 1856
Nerius terebrans Hennig, 1937
Nerius terebratus Enderlein, 1922
Nerius nigrofuscus Czerny, 1932
Nerius purpusianus Enderlein, 1922

References

Nerioidea genera
Taxa named by Johan Christian Fabricius
Neriidae